Metropolitan Stock Exchange of India Limited (MSE) is a  stock exchange under the ownership of Ministry of Finance, Government of India. The Exchange was notified of a "recognized stock exchange" under Section 2(39) of the Companies Act, 1956 by the Ministry of Corporate Affairs, Govt. of India, on December 21, 2012. The exchange's shareholders are some of India's top public sector banks, private sector banks, and domestic financial institutions.

Mr. S.V.D. Nageswara Rao, Senior faculty of Economics and Finance at the School of Management IIT Mumbai is Chairman (Public Interest Director) on the Board. Latika S Kundu took over the reins of the exchange as Managing Director & Chief Executive Officer on 12 March 2020.

Shareholders include public and private sectors banks, Exchange, Financial Institutions and private investors. Some of these shareholders are State Bank of India, Union Bank of India, UCO Bank, Canara Bank, Punjab National Bank, Indian Overseas Bank, Indian Bank, Bank of India, Bank of Baroda, HDFC Bank, Axis Bank, MCX, IL&FS, IFCI and Mr. Radhakishan S Damani, Mr. Siddhartha Balachandran, Mr. Nemish Shah.

Subsidiary 
Metropolitan Clearing Corporation of India Ltd. (MCCIL), was jointly promoted by Metropolitan Stock Exchange of India Ltd. (MSE), Multi-Commodity Exchange of India Limited (MCX) and Financial Technologies India Limited (FTIL), as a new age Clearing Corporation constituted to undertake clearing and settlement of deals in multi asset classes.

The company was incorporated on 7 November 2008 and was permitted by SEBI to undertake clearing and settlement functions of trades done in MSE on 2 January 2009. The company commenced its operations on 16 February 2009.

Products 
Currency Futures & Options

• Available for trading in USD/INR, GBP/INR, EUR/INR and JPY/INR

Contracts along with cross currency pairs of EUR/USD, USD/JPY, GBP/USD

Interest Rate Futures

• Futures contracts on 6 GOI Bonds with maturity buckets of 6 years, 10 years and 13 years are made available

Equity Segment 

• 1348 companies are available for trading

Equity Derivatives

• Index Futures and Index Options are available for trading on MSE Index SX40

• Available F&O trading in the Exchange on 191 Stocks

ETFs

• 49 ETF’s available for trading

Gold Bond

• 42 Sovereign Gold Bonds (SGBs)

Debt

• Currently suspended

See also 
 List of stock exchanges in the Commonwealth of Nations

References

1. MSE to conduct mock trading session DR site on Saturday
 20.  MSEI postpones decision to extend trading hours 
 39.  Mse in equity deal with UK's GMEX to EXPAND offerings
2. Mumbai, 3 Aug Metropolitan Stock Exchange of India (MSE) today said it will conduct mock trading session in all the segments on Saturday, 5 August. 
 21.  MSEI to submit report to Compat on ₹856 crore claim against NSE
 40.  Metropolitan Stock Exchange  and GMEX agree to collaborate in exchange space in India
 3. Will BSE, NSE extend trading hours till 5 pm? 
 22.  Dispute relates to NSE’s alleged abuse of dominance in currency derivatives
 41.  GMEX to buy 5% stake in Metropolitan Exchange  By Palak Shah ET Bureau|Updated: 26 May 2017, 10.02 AM IST
4. Metropolitan Stock Exchange 
 23.  MSEI to submit report on Rs 856 crore claim against NSE
2.  Metropolitan Stock Exchange of India Limited (MSE), the third national level stock exchange, today announced it has agreed to collaborate with GMEX Group (GMEX) of London, provider of multi-asset exchange trading and post trade technology and business solutions.
 24.  Sebi asks stock exchanges to strengthen system audits
 43.   Metropolitan Stock Exchange and GMEX Agree to Collaborate in Exchange Space in India] 
6    MSEI rolls out revival strategy to stay afloat]M
7.  Metropolitan Stock Exchange Eyes Profitability, IPO In Next Two Years  
 26. MSEI to trade in gold bonds, interest rate futures
 44.  Eyeing a relevant spot among exchanges
8. SEBI renews Metropolitan Stock Exchange licence till 2017 
 27.  Metropolitan Stock Exchange to raise funds, target new businesses
 9.  Jhunjhunwala, Damani-backed Metropolitan Stock Exchange raises capital 
 28.  Metropolitan Stock Exchange*
 10. MSEI to partner Moody's for new indices
 29.   [http://www.livemint.com/Companies/ztChCNI61TllKRdXhu3xPO/MSEI-appoints-Udai-Kumar-as-fulltime-MD-and-CEO.html MSEI appoints Udai Kumar as full-time MD and CEO
 11. Metropolitan Stock Exchange of India adds 100 more companies 
 12. MSEI completes trading on disaster recovery site
 49.  MSEI extends trading window: Will BSE, NSE follow suit?  
 13. GMEX, Metropolitan Stock Exchange Collaborate in the Indian Exchange Space *32.  SMEs reluctant to list on bourses, notes Sebi
 14. MSEI postpones extension of trading hours  India Infoline News Service Mumbai 5 July 2017 15:55 IST
 16.  Metropolitan Stock Exchange Of India 
 35.  MSEI to launch rights issue to raise Rs 97 cr from Monday Press Trust of India,Mumbai  Last Updated at 19 August 2016 15:57 IST 
 36.  MSEI to launch rights issue to raise Rs 97 cr from Monday
 18.  Metropolitan Stock Exchange to launch corporate bond platform in July .
 37.  Metropolitan Stock nets Rs 75 crore through rights issue 
 38. Metropolitan Stock Exchange of India Ltd

Foreign exchange companies
Futures exchanges
Stock exchanges in India
Financial services companies established in 2008
Financial services companies based in Mumbai
2008 establishments in Maharashtra
Indian companies established in 2008